Designed by Franz Bezina, the Aeros motorcycle was manufactured between 1927 and 1929. It featured a BMW-inspired frame with a leaf spring fork and 347cc and 497cc three-valve overhead camshaft single-cylinder engines.

References

Motorcycle manufacturers of Czechoslovakia
Defunct manufacturing companies of Czechoslovakia